Gitanjali is a collection of poems by Indian poet Rabindranath Tagore.

Gitanjali , Geetanjali or Geethanjali (Devanagari:गीतांजलि) may also refer to:

Literature 
 Gitanjali Literary Prize, a Franco-Indian literary award

Film and television 
 Geethanjali (1985 film), a Tamil film
 Geethanjali (1989 film), a Telugu film
 Geetanjali (1993 film), a Hindi film
 Geethanjali (2014 film), a Telugu film
 Geethaanjali, a 2013 Malayalam film
 Geethanjali (TV series), a Tamil soap opera

People 
 Geetanjali (actress), Telugu film actress
 Gitanjali (given name), an Indian feminine given name (including a list of persons with the name)

Others
 Gitanjali (Ceylonese newspaper), a defunct Ceylonese newspaper
 Geetanjali Enclave, a colony in Delhi
 Gitanjali Express, an express train service between Kolkata and Mumbai
 Gitanjali Group, a jewelry retailer
 Gitanjali metro station, a station of the Kolkata metro

See also